Chthonobacter albigriseus  is a Gram-negative, aerobic and non-motile bacteria from the genus Chthonobacter which has been isolated from grass-field soil in Cheonan on Korea.

References

External links
Type strain of Chthonobacter albigriseus at BacDive -  the Bacterial Diversity Metadatabase

Hyphomicrobiales
Bacteria described in 2017